Frank Chin (born February 25, 1940) is an American author and playwright. He is considered to be one of the pioneers of Asian-American theatre.

Life and career 
Frank Chin was born in Berkeley, California on February 25, 1940. His grandfather worked on the Western Pacific Railroad.  He remained under the care of a retired vaudeville couple in Placerville, California until he was 6. At that time, his mother brought him back to the San Francisco Bay Area and thereafter Chin grew up in Oakland Chinatown. He attended the University of California, Berkeley, and graduated from the University of California, Santa Barbara in 1965. According to Chin, who had returned from a sabbatical working as the first Chinese brakeman for the Southern Pacific railroad, he intimidated a dean into graduating him with a bachelor's degree in English: "[I said] 'I want a decision by Friday' and he said, 'Well, I'm a very busy man,' and I said, 'You're a working stiff like me - you have a decision Friday and I don't care what it is. Either I've graduated or I haven't graduated because I have to get back to work.' Friday, I walked by the office and the secretary jumps up and says: 'You've graduated!' I said, 'That's all I want to know'."

Early in his career, Chin worked as a story editor and scriptwriter on Sesame Street and as a reporter for KING-TV in Seattle.

Chin is considered to be one of the pioneers of Asian-American theatre. He founded the Asian American Theater Workshop, which later became the Asian American Theater Company in 1973.  He first gained notoriety as a playwright in the 1970s. His play The Chickencoop Chinaman was the first by an Asian American to be produced on a major New York stage. As an author, Chin has won three American Book Awards: the first in 1982 for his plays The Chickencoop Chinaman and The Year of the Dragon, the second in 1989 for a collection of short stories entitled The Chinaman Pacific and Frisco R.R. Co., and the third in 2000 for lifetime achievement.

Stereotypes of Asian Americans and traditional Chinese folklore are common themes in much of his work. Many of his works revolve around criticism of the racism in the United States. Frank Chin has accused other Asian American writers, particularly Maxine Hong Kingston, of furthering such stereotypes and misrepresenting the traditional stories. Chin also has been highly critical of American writer Amy Tan for her telling of Chinese-American stories, indicating that her body of work has furthered and reinforced stereotypical views of this group. On a radio program, Chin has also debated the scholar Yunte Huang regarding the latter's evaluation of Charlie Chan in his writing. This discussion was later evaluated on the activist blog "Big WOWO."

In addition to his work as an author and playwright, Frank Chin has also worked extensively with Japanese American resisters of the draft in WWII. His novel, Born in the U.S.A., is dedicated to this subject. Chin was one of several writers (Jeffery Paul Chan, Lawson Fusao Inada, and Shawn Wong of CARP, Combined Asian American Resources Project) who worked to republish John Okada's novel No-No Boy in the 1970s; Chin contributed an afterword which can be found in every reprinting of the novel. Chin has appeared in Jeff Adachi's  The Slanted Screen, a 2006 documentary film about stereotypical depictions of Asian males in American cinema. Chin was also an instrumental organizer for the first Day of Remembrance.

Chin is also a musician. In the mid-1960s, he taught Robbie Krieger, a member of The Doors, how to play the flamenco guitar. After a stroke in 1990, he lost his ability to play the guitar and, temporarily, to laugh.

Chin was married for five years to Kathy Chang in the 1970s. Kathleen Chang (October 10, 1950 – October 22, 1996), was better known by her performance name Kathy Change. She was a Sino-American political activist, writer, and performance artist.

Bibliography

Plays 
The Chickencoop Chinaman (1971) the first play by an Asian American to be produced as a mainstream New York theater production.
The Year of the Dragon (1974) 
Gee Pop! (1976) An unpublished play about Charlie Chan which was produced by East West Players. Elements of this play would appear in some of Chin's later work.

Books
Yardbird Reader Volume 3 (1974) (co-editor, contributor)
Aiiieeeee! An Anthology of Asian-American Writers (1974) (Co-editor, contributor) 
The Chinaman Pacific and Frisco R.R. Co. (1988) 
Donald Duk (1991) 
The Big Aiiieeeee!: An Anthology of Chinese American and Japanese American Literature (1991) (Co-editor, contributor) 
Gunga Din Highway (1994) 
Bulletproof Buddhists and Other Essays (1998) 
Born in the USA: A Story of Japanese America, 1889-1947 (2002) 
The Confessions of a Number One Son: The Great Chinese American Novel (2015)

Works in anthologies
 Food for All His Dead, in The Young American Writers (1967) (Richard Kostelanetz, ed.) 
 Goong Hai Fot Choi, in 19 Necromancers from Now (1970) (Ishmael Reed ed.) 
 Racist Love in Seeing Through Shuck (1972) co-authored with Jeffery Paul Chan (Richard Kostelanetz, ed.) 
 Food for All His Dead, in Asian-American Authors (1972) (Kai-yu Hsu and Helen Palubinskas, ed.) 
 The Year of the Dragon (excerpt), in Modern American Scenes for Student Actors (1978) (Wynn Handman, ed.) 
 How to Watch a Chinese Movie with the Right "i" in Bamboo Ridge Press Number Five: New Moon (December 1979-February 1980) (Eric Chock and Darrell H.Y. Lum, ed.)
 The Most Popular Book in China, in Quilt 4 (1984) (Ishmael Reed and Al Young, ed.) 
 Confessions of a Chinatown Cowboy (excerpts), in American Childhoods: An Anthology (1987) (David W. McCullough, ed.)   
 The Only Real Day, in The Before Columbus Foundation Fiction Anthology, Selections from the American Book Awards 1980–1990 (1992) 
 Railroad Standard Time, in Growing Up Asian American: An Anthology (1993) (Maria Hong, ed.) 
 Yes, Young Daddy, in Coming of age in America : a multicultural anthology (1994) (Mary Frosch, ed.) 
 The Mother "I" (excerpt from Gunga Din Highway), in On a Bed of Rice: An Asian American Erotic Feast (1995) (Geraldine Kudaka, ed.)  
 Rendezvous, in Asian American Literature: A Brief Introduction and Anthology (1996) (Shawn Wong, ed.) 
 Railroad Standard Time, in Growing Up Ethnic in America  (1999) (Maria Mazziotti Gillan and Jennifer Gillan, ed.) 
 Pidgin Contest Along I-5, in Writing Home: Award-Winning Literature from the New West (1999) (Brian Bouldrey, ed.)  
 Donald Duk (excerpt), in Asian-American Literature: An Anthology (1999) (Shirley Geok-lin Lim, ed.) 
 The Chickencoop Chinaman (excerpt), in Monologues for Actors of Color: Men (2000) (Roberta Uno, ed.)  
 Railroad Standard Time, in Bold Words: A Century of Asian American Writing  (2001) (Rajini Srikanth, ed.) 
 The Only Real Day, in American Short Stories since 1945 (2001) (John G. Parks ed.)  
 Pearl Harbor Revisited, in Asian Americans on War & Peace (2002) (Russell Leong and Don Nakanishi ed.)  
 Pidgin Contest Along I-5, in Crossing Into America: The New Literature of Immigration (2003) (Louis Mendoza and Subramanian Shankar, ed.) 
 An Introduction to Chinese- and Japanese-American Literature, in From Totems to Hip-Hop: A Multicultural Anthology of Poetry Across the Americas, 1900-2002 (2003) co-authored with Jeffery Paul Chan, Lawson Fusao Inada, and Shawn Wong (Ishmael Reed ed.)  
 Come All Ye Asian American Writers of the Real and the Fake (excerpt), in A Companion to Asian American Studies (2005) (Kent A. Ono, ed.)

Movies
The Year of the Dragon was an adaptation of Chin's play of the same name.  Starring George Takei, the film was televised in 1975 as part of the PBS Great Performances series.

As an actor, Chin, appeared as an extra in the riot scene of the made-for-TV movie adaptation of Farewell to Manzanar. Chin was one of several Asian American writers who appeared in the movie; Shawn Wong and Lawson Fusao Inada, who, like Chin were co-editors of the anthology Aiiieeeee!, also acted in the riot scene.
 Chin would go on to criticize the movie in the May 1976 issue of Mother Jones.

Documentaries
What's Wrong with Frank Chin is a 2005 biographical documentary, directed by Curtis Choy, about Chin's life.

Frank Chin was interviewed in the documentary The Slanted Screen (2006), directed by Jeff Adachi, about the representation of Asian and Asian American men in Hollywood.

Chin wrote the script for the 1967 documentary And Still Champion! The Story of Archie Moore. Chin's script was narrated by actor Jack Palance. Some of Chin's experiences would be worked into his first play, in which the protagonist is making a documentary about a boxer.

Chin researched and hosted Chinaman's Chance (1972) an Ene Riisna directed documentary focusing on the conditions of Chinatown communities in America. Interview subjects included Roland Winters, Betty Lee Sung, and Ben Fee.

Chin also directed a documentary short in 1972, The Last Temple about the Taoist temple in Hanford, California, which dates back to 1893, and the effort to preserve and restore it.

Theatre Communications Group produced the Legacy Leaders of Color Video Project, a series highlighting influential figures in the American minority theaters. Set to be released in 2017, one of the episodes focuses on Frank Chin, his time with the Asian American Theater Company, and Chin's influence. 

In 2019, It Takes a Lunatic a Netflix distributed documentary about Wynn Handman was released. Handman had produced Chin's two plays at the American Place Theatre, and Chin was one of the interview subjects. 

Be Water, a 2020 episode of the ESPN documentary series 30 for 30 about Bruce Lee, featured archival footage of Chin.

See also 

Chinese American literature
List of Asian American writers

References

References
Hong, T. (1995) "Searching for Frank Chin". A. Magazine. modelminority.com. 
Richardson, S. (1999) Lessons of "Donald Duk."-Novel by Frank Chin-Critical Essay. MELUS.

External links

Frank Chin's blog

Frank Chin Papers at the California Ethnic and Multicultural Archives, UC Santa Barbara Library
What's Wrong With Frank Chin? (documentary)

1940 births
American novelists of Chinese descent
Living people
American dramatists and playwrights of Chinese descent
20th-century American novelists
Writers from the San Francisco Bay Area
American short story writers of Chinese descent
20th-century American dramatists and playwrights
American male novelists
American male dramatists and playwrights
American male short story writers
20th-century American short story writers
Activists from California
American Book Award winners
20th-century American male writers